Mikhail Mikhaylovich Shultz (also spelled Schultz, Shul'ts, Shults, Shul’c etc.) (1 July 1919 – 9 October 2006), was a Soviet/Russian physical chemist, and an artist.

In Soviet Union, Russia, and outside Shultz is primarily known for his research in the chemical thermodynamics of heterogeneous chemical compounds, electrochemistry of glasses, membrane electrochemistry; for works in the field of ion exchange and phase equilibria of multicomponent compounds, and theory of glass electrode; Shultz also worked on thermal protection system for the Soviet Buran spacecraft and credited with research in optical fibers in 80s.

His works helped to contribute into creation of early pH-meters and ionometry, production organisation, instrumentation and materials commonly used in medicine, chemical and nuclear industry, aviation rocket and space technology, agriculture and many other areas.

Biography 
Mikhail Shultz was a son of Mikhail Alexandrovich Shultz (1896–1954; the Naval officer, belonging to the latest issue of the Imperial Naval Cadet Corps — 1916) and a great-grandson of the Russian physicist Dmitry Aleksandrovich Lachinov (1842—1902).

M. Shultz was a descendant of the German sculptor, the Danish royal medallist Anton Schultz (Anton Schultz — Schleswig-Holstein, Saxony, Hamburg, Denmark, XVII–XVIII cc.) who carried out orders the Russian Court as early as Copenhagen, and arrived at the service in Russia with Peter the Great.

He was born on 1 July 1919 in Petrograd, in 1937—graduated with honours from high school (Staraya Russa; where he deported with his mother Helen (née Barsukova) in 1929, his father M. A. Shultz was arrested in 1925 as a suspect in the «counter-revolutionary monarchist conspiracy»; he spent 10 years in Solovki prison camp, and 3 years on the construction of the Moscow Canal. released in 1937, rehabilitated in 1991).

1937–1941—a student of the chemical faculty of the Leningrad State University (M. Schulz, was a talented artist—when he arrived in Leningrad in 1937, he was faced a choice: to enter the Academy of Fine Arts, or go to university, ... and although he considered himself an dilettante, his works show the realisation of talent for this part), in 1938—joined the All-Union Chemical Society named by D. I. Mendeleev, in 1941–1945—a volunteer on The Great Patriotic War, first lieutenant, chief of the chemical service of battalion.

Scientific career 
 1947—graduated with honours from the Chemical faculty of the Leningrad State University;
 1947—1950 – the Post-graduate under the supervision of professor Boris Petrovich Nikolsky).
 1951—the Candidate of chemical sciences (thesis «Study of sodium function of glass electrodes»).
 1950–1959—the Assistant and from 1953—the Associate Professor of physical chemistry chair of the Leningrad State University Chemical faculty, cooperation with professor Aleksey Vasilyevich Storonkin, his second teacher, in the field of thermodynamics of heterogeneous systems.
 1956–1972—Head of Laboratory of the electrochemistry of glass, which he founded in the Research Institute of Chemistry of the Leningrad State University, which together with a number of other institutions was carrying out the government order to develop means of pH-metry (since 1954; including the monitoring of nuclear and plutonium synthesis), he organised a systematic study of electrode properties of glasses, depending on their composition.
 1965—the Doctor of chemical sciences (thesis: «Electrode properties of glasses»), approved in the rank of professor exercises.
 1967—1972—the Dean of the Leningrad State University Chemical faculty.
 1972—the Corresponding member of the USSR Academy of Sciences.
 1972–1998—the Director of the Institute of Silicate Chemistry (USSR Academy of Sciences; later — Russian Academy of Sciences); in that period a new building was constructed and the Institute square tripled.
 1975–1990—the Chief-Editor of the magazine «Physics and Chemistry of Glass» of the USSR Academy of Sciences (established by Shultz; released since 1975).
 1979—the Academician (the USSR Academy of Sciences; from 1991—RAS).

Scientific accomplishments 
Mikhail Shultz is the author of fundamental works on physical chemistry, thermodynamics, chemistry and electrochemistry of glass, membrane electrochemistry, the theory of ion-exchange and phase equilibria of multi-component systems, for a total of more than 500 scientific papers, including several monographs, and approximately 20 inventions

Glass electrode 

His name had to do with the beginning of developing pH-metry and ionometry, the creation and organisation of measuring equipment production, widely used in medicine, chemical and nuclear industry, aerospace technology, agriculture and many other fields.

In 1951 M. Shultz strictly thermodynamically proved the sodium function of different glasses in various areas of pH, which anticipated many directions of further studies, and his work «Studies of sodium functions of glass electrodes» is regarded to be ones of the most considerable in relation to all those written on the glass electrode (it was very important step for realisation ion-exchange theory of the glass electrode, and it has become an important part in the thermodynamic ion-exchange theory of GE Nikolsky-Shultz-Eisenman).

His achievements in solving the fundamental problems of chemical thermodynamics are noteworthy. Special mention should be made of the generalisation of the stability conditions for the Gibbs equilibrium to heterogeneous (multicomponent, multiphase) systems (1954). M. Shultz developed a method for calculating changes in the thermodynamic properties of a heterogeneous system from data on the composition of the coexisting phases and on the change in the chemical potential of only one component («method of the third component», so called else «Shultz-Storonkin’s method»). In the frame of the thermodynamic theory existing is the «Filippov-Shultz rule».

The first results of the study an Mössbauer effect in iron-containing glasses are mentioned in the thesis of Mikhail Shultz. Data from M. Schulz and staff of his laboratory are exceptional interest for interpretation of Mössbauer's spectra, where the range assessment all of possible states of iron atoms is extremely wide and difficult. M. Shultz demonstrated the possibility to get a glass electrode with redox function (1964), which allowed to create a fundamentally new measuring technique, without the use of measuring precious metals, and that gave a huge economic impact. The industrial production of pH-meters was originated and connected with his name.

In the 1950—1960 on the basis of representative series of glasses M. Shultz with collaborators estimated the impact of the third component on electrode properties of alkaline-silicate glasses (practically any element of the periodical system of D. I. Mendeleev, capable to be present at glass, was involved as that component).

According to the concept of glass developed by M. Shultz, in analogy with pH for aqueous solutions he proposed an innovative idea to establish for glasses and melts—the degree of acidity pO (negative logarithm of the activity of oxygen ions O2−) and standards for methods of measurement: pO is inversely proportional to the degree of basicity and concentration of the oxide.

Silicon chemistry 
The Under the guidance of M. Shultz developed the heat resistant silicone and carbon-fiber based coatings for the protection of structural materials of various spacecrafts (including military rockets, and for the spacecraft Buran, similar to Space Shuttle thermal protection system) and thin-film coatings used for semiconductor wafers, organo-silicate corrosion-resistant, anti-icing, dielectric, thermally insulating, radiation-proof coatings for construction, electrical engineering and shipbuilding  materials. Large enough the contribution of the scientist is in the sphere of developing new construction materials. In 1981 Shultz published paper on the optical fiber made out of pure cristobalite and silicone shell.

M. Shultz is a founder one of Russian scientific schools. Under his leadership 45 people maintained candidate theses, 8 people of his school became Doctors of Sciences, members of the Russian Academy of Sciences.

In July 1989 M. Shultz was the president of the 15th International Congress on Glass held in Leningrad. It is his merit that in 1979 Russia was admitted to the most authoritative organisation of that profile—International Commission on Glass, founded in 1933.
He was a President of the Russian Ceramic Society (1995—2002).

Awards and academic recognition 
 The Hero of Socialist Labour (1991);
 The Order of Lenin (2 Orders);
 The Order of the Red Banner of Labour (2 Orders);
 The Order of the Patriotic War, II grade (2 Orders);
 Twice the USSR State Prize laureate (1973, 1986);
 The academician of the USSR Academy of Sciences (1979; 1991—RAS);
 1999—The Russian Academy of Sciences Prize by name of I. V. Grebenschikov for series of papers «Thermodynamics and chemical structure of oxide melts and glasses»
 2003—The Prize by name of D. I. Mendeleev of the St.Petersburg Government and the St.-Petersburg Scientific Center of RAS (one of three scientists awarded on the occasion of 300 anniversary of St. Petersburg)
 1954—laureat University Award;
 1956—winner of the first university prize for his work «Theory of the glass electrode» — with co-authors, the order of the rector of Leningrad State University (A. D. Aleksandrov) from 25 February 1957;
 1998—Honorary Professorship of the Saint Petersburg State Institute of Technology.
 2005—Honorary Professorship of St. Petersburg State University.
 Avicenna reporter (2.X.1981, Dushanbe).
 Mendeleev reader (24.III.1983, St.Petersburg).
 1996—Winner of the International Academic Publishing Company (MIAK) Nauka-Interperiodica for a series of articles «Thermodynamics of glasses and glass-forming melts: theory and experiment»;
 2000—Winner of the International Academic Publishing Company (MIAK) Nauka-Interperiodica for the series of articles «Modern Thermodynamics and theoretical studies»;

Member of numerous scientific state and international commissions and committees, scientific societies.

Member of editor's boards of several Russian and foreign scientific journals.

See also 
 Glass electrode

References

External links
 Thermodynamics and the Chemical structure of Melts and Glasses. In hour of Academician Mikhail M. Shultz on the occasion of his 80th birthday. — International conference: Russian Academy of Sciences. Grebenshchikov Institute of Silicate Chemistry (RAS). 7–9 September 1999. St. Petersburg. 1999
International Organising Committee: Chairman Acad. Yu. A. Buslaev — Academician–Secretary of the Department of Physical Chemistry and Technology of Inorganic Materials of the RAS (Moscow); Prof. P. J. Bray — Broun University, Providence, RI (USA); Prof. J. Matousek — President of the Czech Glass Society (Czech Republic); Prof. O. V. Mazurin — Institute of Silicate Chemistry (St. Petersburg); Prof. E. A. Poray–Koshits — Institute of Silicate Chemistry (St. Petersburg); Prof. L. D. Pye — President of the International Commission on Glass (USA); Prof. H. A. Schaeffer — Managing Director of the German Society of Glass Technology, and the Research Association of the German Glass Industry (Germany); Prof. A. C. Wright — University of Reading, Reading (UK) and other.

External links 
 Mikhail Mikhailovich Shultz. On the Occasion of His Eighty-Fifth Birthday (fragment) — Glass Physics and Chemistry, Vol. 30, No. 5, 2004, pp. 365–366
 Михаил Михайлович Шульц — «Санкт-Петербургский университет» № 20 (3743), 31 октября 2006 года (Memory of Mikhail Shultz in the magazine of SPb State University, 31 October 2006)
 I. V. Grebenshchikov Institute of Silicate Chemistry—Saint Petersburg Scientific Center of the Russian Academy of Sciences (SPbRC RAS)
 Several articles in the 90 th anniversary M. Schulz. Summaries in the «Vestnik» — Scientific-theoretical journal of SPb State University (Physics and Chemistry. Series 4. Issue 1. March 2010).

1919 births
2006 deaths
Soviet physical chemists
Full Members of the USSR Academy of Sciences
Full Members of the Russian Academy of Sciences
Academic staff of Saint Petersburg State University
Recipients of the USSR State Prize
Heroes of Socialist Labour
Soviet inventors
Academic staff of the Saint Petersburg State Institute of Technology